The 2025 FIBA Asia Cup qualification is a basketball competition that is being played from June 2022 to February 2025, to determine the FIBA Asia-Oceania nations who will qualify for the 2025 FIBA Asia Cup.

Format
The qualification process started in 2022, with Pre-qualifiers being contested on sub-zone and regional basis. Eight teams will advance to the qualifiers, joining the sixteen teams from the 2023 FIBA World Cup Asian Qualifiers.

Entrants

Pre-qualifiers

First round
Teams played a round-robin tournament to determine the three best ranked teams that will advance to the second round.

Teams from the WABA, GBA, CABA, and SABA sub-zones played in Group A and B, forming the West region. While teams from Oceania and the SEABA and EABA sub-zones played in Groups C and D, forming the East region. The groups were played at a single venue.

Group A
The tournament was held in Qatar.

Group B
The tournament was held in Palestine.

Group C
A four-team tournament was scheduled to be held in Guam. After Hong Kong and Cambodia withdrew before the start of the competition, only one game was planned to be played with both teams advancing to the second round. In October 2022, Hong Kong re-entered the tournament, which was played in India in November 2022.

Group D
The tournament was held in Mongolia.

Second round
The 12 qualified teams will be divided into two groups of six teams (teams from groups A/B form Group E and teams from groups C/D into Group F). The results against teams that advanced are carried over and the teams will play against the teams they did not meet in the first round. The top four teams of each group advance to the qualifiers. The groups will be played in a single venue.

Group E
The tournament was held in Qatar.

Group F
The tournament was held in Mongolia.

Qualifiers
24 teams will compete for 16 places at the final tournament. Matches will be played over four windows:  November 2023, February 2024, November 2024 and February 2025.

Participating teams

References

External links
Tournament summary

FIBA